Asim Zec (born 23 January 1994) is a Bosnian professional footballer who plays as a right winger for NK Travnik.

Club career
Zec joined Hradec Králové from Iskra Bugojno in July 2012. He twice managed to score four goals in one game for the youth team of Hradec Králové in his debut season. He returned to Bosnia and Herzegovina in February 2014 to play for Olimpik. After Olimpik, Zec also played for Čelik Zenica, Velež Mostar, Travnik and Sloboda Tuzla.

In June 2017, he signed a contract with Željezničar. In May 2018, Zec won the 2017–18 Bosnian Cup with Željezničar. He left Željezničar on 6 February 2020, terminating his contract with the club. Four days after leaving Željezničar, on 10 February, Zec signed a one-and-a-half year contract with Zrinjski Mostar. He made his official debut and scored his first official goal for Zrinjski in a 2–0 league win against his former club Čelik on 23 February 2020. Zec left Zrinjski on 30 September 2020.

In October 2020, he returned to Željezničar. Zec played his first official game since his return to the club on 21 October 2020, in a cup game against Goražde. After his contract with Željezničar expired, on 15 January 2021, he left the club once again.

International career
Zec made caps for the Bosnia and Herzegovina U19 and Bosnia and Herzegovina U21 national teams, even scoring one goal for the U19 team.

He played for the U19 team in the UEFA European U19 Championship qualification round.

Personal life
Zec's older brother, Ermin, is also a professional footballer who played alongside him at Željezničar.

Honours
Željezničar
Bosnian Cup: 2017–18

References

External links
Profile at iDNES.cz

1994 births
Living people
People from Bugojno
Association football wingers
Bosnia and Herzegovina footballers
Bosnia and Herzegovina youth international footballers
Bosnia and Herzegovina under-21 international footballers
NK Iskra Bugojno players
FC Hradec Králové players
FK Olimpik players
NK Čelik Zenica players
FK Velež Mostar players
NK Travnik players
FK Sloboda Tuzla players
FK Željezničar Sarajevo players
HŠK Zrinjski Mostar players
First League of the Federation of Bosnia and Herzegovina players
Czech First League players
Czech National Football League players
Premier League of Bosnia and Herzegovina players
Bosnia and Herzegovina expatriate footballers
Expatriate footballers in the Czech Republic
Bosnia and Herzegovina expatriate sportspeople in the Czech Republic